The 2004 Hamburg Masters was a men's tennis tournament played on outdoor clay courts. It was the 98th edition of the Hamburg Masters, and was part of the ATP Masters Series of the 2004 ATP Tour. It took place at the Rothenbaum Tennis Center in Hamburg, Germany, from 10 May through 17 May 2004. First-seeded Roger Federer won the singles title.

Finals

Singles

 Roger Federer defeated  Guillermo Coria 4–6, 6–4, 6–2, 6–3
It was Roger Federer's 4th title of the year, and his 15th overall. It was his 2nd Masters title of the year, and his 3rd overall. It was his second title at the event after winning in 2002.

Doubles

 Wayne Black /  Kevin Ullyett defeated  Bob Bryan /  Mike Bryan 6–4, 6–2

References

External links
  
   
 Association of Tennis Professionals (ATP) tournament profile

 
Hamburg Masters
Hamburg Masters
Hamburg European Open
May 2004 sports events in Europe